Iryna Leletko (born 16 April 1993) is a cross-country skier from Ukraine.

Performances

External links

1993 births
Living people
L